EPB is an American electric power distribution and telecommunications company.

EPB may also refer to:
 Boricua Popular Army, a clandestine organization based in Puerto Rico
 Earth pressure balance
 Electric park brake
 Electro-pneumatic brake system on British railway trains
 Export Promotion Bureau, Bangladesh
 Export Promotion Bureau of Pakistan, now the Trade Development Authority of Pakistan
 Class designation for rail coaches used by Reading electric multiple units on its Philadelphia commuter rail lines

Biology and healthcare
 Extensor pollicis brevis, a muscle of the thumb